Soy Luna is an Argentine telenovela produced by Disney Channel Latin America. Developed by Disney Channel Latin America and Europe, Middle East and Africa (EMEA), the series stars Karol Sevilla along with Ruggero Pasquarelli. The first season was confirmed to have 80 episodes.

On May 13, 2017, Disney Channel confirmed that the show has been renewed for a third season.

The series premiered on March 14, 2016 and concluded on August 17, 2018. During the course of the series, 220 episodes of Soy Luna aired over three seasons.

Series overview

Episodes

Season 1 (2016)

Season 2 (2017)

Season 3 (2018)

References 

Lists of Argentine television series episodes
Lists of children's television series episodes
Lists of Disney Channel television series episodes